On 3 September 2020, at 2:53 am EDT, a 16-year-old male from South Miami, Florida was arrested in connection with distributed denial-of-service (DDoS) attacks on the Miami-Dade County Public Schools's computer network, the fourth largest in the US, causing the system to crash during the first three days of the school year. It occurred as the school system was attempting to conduct internet-based instruction during the COVID-19 pandemic of 2020.
After monitoring the IP addresses using the network, investigators concluded the teenager and several foreign actors had hacked the system. At the time, the school district had contracted Stride, Inc. (at the time known as K12 Inc.) to provide the software necessary for the internet-based instruction. Despite its price tag of $15.3 million, Stride was surprisingly susceptible to the attacks. Consequently, the school district sought the help of the FBI and U.S. Secret Service to investigate.

Method used in the attacks 

According to an affidavit, the suspect used Low Orbit Ion Cannon (LOIC) to launch the attacks. LOIC is an application that uses DDoS-style attacks to disrupt websites. However, investigators say the teen was not the only hacker involved. Numerous other IP addresses were associated with the attacks originating from Russia, the Ukraine, China, Iraq, and other countries. Investigators said the suspect was responsible for eight of at least 24 attacks.

After the accused admitted to his involvement, he was charged with the crime of using a computer to defraud, a third-degree felony.

Agencies involved in the investigation 

The FBI, the US Secret Service, and the Florida Department of Law Enforcement were the investigating agencies. Former US Congresswoman Debbie Mucarsel-Powell of Florida's 26th congressional district formally asked the FBI for a briefing on the issue. US Senator Marco Rubio from Florida asked the Department of Homeland Security for information about the attacks as well.

See also 

 List of cyberattacks on U.S. schools 2020
 List of data breaches
 Hit-and-run DDoS
 Hacks at the Massachusetts Institute of Technology
 Ransomware

References 

Miami-Dade County Public Schools
Miami-Dade